Harris–Poindexter House and Store is a historic home, store, and farm complex located at Mineral, Louisa County, Virginia. The house was built about 1837, and is a two-story, three bay, frame farmhouse in the Greek Revival style. The store was built about 1865, and is one-story frame building. Also on the property are a contributing smokehouse (c. 1893), tenant house (Doll House) (c. 1930), and a variety of early- to mid-20th century farm related outbuildings, and a late-19th century grist mill.

It was listed on the National Register of Historic Places in 2002.

References

Houses on the National Register of Historic Places in Virginia
Farms on the National Register of Historic Places in Virginia
Greek Revival houses in Virginia
Houses completed in 1837
Houses in Louisa County, Virginia
National Register of Historic Places in Louisa County, Virginia